Goodenia potamica is a species of flowering plant in the family Goodeniaceae and is endemic to the Northern Territory. It is a prostrate to ascending herb with elliptic to oblong leaves on the stems and racemes of yellow flowers.

Description

Taxonomy and naming
Goodenia potamica was first formally described in 1990 Roger Charles Carolin in the journal Telopea from specimens collected by J. Must near the Liverpool River crossing in 1972. The specific epithet (potamica) means "pertaining to a river", referring to the habitat of this species.

Distribution and habitat
This goodenia grows on river flats and in woodland in the Liverpool River area of the Northern Territory.

Conservation status
Goodenia potamica is classified as "data deficient" under the Northern Territory Government Territory Parks and Wildlife Conservation Act 1976.

References

potamica
Flora of the Northern Territory
Plants described in 1990
Taxa named by Roger Charles Carolin
Endemic flora of Australia